William Carl Wilkinson (born August 10, 1964) is an American former professional baseball pitcher. A left-handed pitcher, Wilkinson played for Major League Baseball's (MLB) Seattle Mariners in 1985, and from 1987 to 1988. During his career, he had a 5–8 record, 4.56 earned run average (ERA) and 103 strikeouts in 113⅓ innings pitched.

Career
In the 1983 MLB draft, Wilkinson was selected in the fourth round by the Mariners, with the 87th overall pick. On June 13, 1985, he made his MLB debut with the Mariners, and took the loss against the Kansas City Royals after allowing four earned runs in five and two-thirds innings. Five days later, Wilkinson lost in his only other appearance during the 1985 season, which was also a start; he allowed five earned runs and recorded only one out. In his two MLB starts, Wilkinson was 0–2 with a 13.50 earned run average. He was the fifth-youngest player in the American League in 1985. Following his start against the Rangers, the Mariners demoted him to the minor leagues.

Wilkinson did not pitch in MLB in 1986; he instead played for the Mariners' Triple-A affiliate, the Calgary Cannons of the Pacific Coast League. In 1985 and 1986, Wilkinson had a combined record of 13–9 while pitching for the Cannons. He appeared in 56 games as a reliever for Seattle in 1987, the most of any Mariners pitcher that year. He compiled a 3–4 record, with a 3.66 earned run average (ERA) and 10 saves. The following season, Wilkinson pitched in 30 games, and posted a 2–2 record with two saves and a career-low 3.48 ERA. However, he suffered an injury to his left shoulder. Before the 1989 season began, Wilkinson was sent back down to the minor leagues, where he was used as a starter. In April, the Mariners traded Wilkinson to the Pittsburgh Pirates as part of a five-player deal. Wilkinson never pitched for the Pirates, and did not return to MLB after 1988. His final minor league season was 1992, when he pitched for two teams in the Oakland Athletics organization, posting an 0–3 record and 8.21 ERA in 23 games.

Family
Born in Greybull, Wyoming, Wilkinson is the great-grandson of Jim Bluejacket, a right-handed pitcher who spent three seasons in the Federal League and National League from 1914 to 1916. Bluejacket and Wilkinson were the first great-grandfather and great-grandson duo that have both played in MLB. Wilkinson's brother, Brian, was selected in the 1987 Major League Baseball draft by the Mariners.

References

External links

1964 births
American expatriate baseball players in Canada
Baseball players from Wyoming
Bellingham Mariners players
Buffalo Bisons (minor league) players
Calgary Cannons players
Huntsville Stars players
Living people
Major League Baseball pitchers
Omaha Royals players
People from Greybull, Wyoming
Salinas Spurs players
Seattle Mariners players
Tacoma Tigers players
Wausau Timbers players